The following tables show state-by-state results in the Australian House of Representatives at the 2010 federal election, Labor 72, Coalition 72, Nationals (WA) 1, Australian Greens 1, with 4 independents.


Australia

Preference flows
 Greens − Labor 78.8% (-0.9) to Coalition 21.2% (+0.9)
 Family First − Coalition 59.8% (-0.5) to Labor 40.2% (+0.5)
 Christian Democrats − Coalition 73.5% (+3.9) to Labor 26.5% (-3.9)
 Nationals WA − Coalition 75.9% (-5.1) to Labor 24.1% (+5.1)
 Independent candidates − Coalition 56.5% (+1.9) to Labor 43.5% (-1.9)

New South Wales

Victoria

Queensland

Western Australia

South Australia

Tasmania

Territories

Australian Capital Territory

Northern Territory

See also
 2010 Australian federal election
 Results of the 2010 Australian federal election (Senate)
 Post-election pendulum for the 2010 Australian federal election
 Members of the Australian House of Representatives, 2010–2013

Notes

References

External links
 Two-party swing by seat: Psephos
 Historical two-party state-by-state results (1949 to present): Australian Electoral Commission
 Psephos (Dr Adam Carr) archive page for the electoral geography of the 2010 Australian election

2010 elections in Australia
House of Representatives 2007